Tongkou is a town located in Anxin County, Hebei, China. It is close to Lake Baiyangdian, the largest freshwater lake in northern China. Now it belongs to Xiong'an New Area.

References 

Township-level divisions of Hebei
Anxin County